Michael Wynne-Parker (born 20 November 1945) is a British author and businessman who is the founder and chairman of Introcom International.

Biography 
Born in Cromford, Derbyshire, he was educated at Lady Manners School. Born Michael Parker, in 1973 his name was legally changed to Michael Wynne-Parker by deed poll.

According to The Guardian, Wynne-Parker has twice been banned by official watchdogs from giving financial advice and serving as a company director.

Wynne-Parker was Principal Secretary of the International Monarchist League from the late 1970s. Following the Marquess of Bristol's death, he became the league's Acting Chancellor until 1987 when Count Nikolai Tolstoy was appointed to that position. Wynne-Parker was then made a Vice-Chancellor, a post which he held until standing down in March 1990.

He was vice-president of The Castle of Mey Trust in 2015.

He once unsuccessfully stood in Norfolk council elections.

Awards and recognitions 
He was made a Knight Commander of the Military and Hospitaller Order of St Lazarus of Jerusalem (KCLJ) in 1980.

Publications
Bridge Over Troubled Water: An insight into the English-Speaking Union and its influence in South Asia (1989)
If My Table Could Talk: Insights Into Remarkable Lives (2011)

References

1945 births
Living people
British writers
British monarchists
People from Cromford